Manas may refer to:

Philosophy and mythology
Manas, the Pali and Sanskrit term for "mind"; see
Manas (early Buddhism)
Manas-vijnana, one of the eight consciousnesses taught in Yogacara Buddhism
Ramcharitmanas, a retelling of the Ramayana
Epic of Manas, a Kyrgyz epic poem with 500,000 lines

Toponymy
Manas River (Drangme Chhu) in southern Bhutan and northeastern India
Royal Manas National Park, a national park in Bhutan
Manas National Park, a national park in the state of Assam, India
Manas (urban-type settlement), an urban-type settlement in Karabudakhkentsky District of the Republic of Dagestan, Russian Federation
Manas, Drôme, a commune in Drôme département in France
Manas-Bastanous, a commune in the Gers department in southwestern France
Manas District, a district of Talas Province, Kyrgyzstan
Manas International Airport, an international airport near Bishkek in Kyrgyzstan
Transit Center at Manas, a United States Air Force base at the airport above
Manas District, Peru, in the Peruvian province of Cajatambo
Manas or Manasi River, a river in the Xinjiang Uighur Autonomous Region of China
Manas County, in the Xinjiang Uighur Autonomous Region, China
Manas Lake, a lake in the Xinjiang Uighur Autonomous Region of China
Manasarovar (Lake Manas), a lake in Tibet

Personal names

Mañas (Spanish surname)
Achero Mañas (born 1966), Spanish film director
Fernando Llorente Mañas (born 1990), Spanish footballer
José Ángel Mañas (born 1971), Spanish writer
Pilar Mañas Brugat (born 1975), Spanish military officer

Armenian surname
Manas Family, an Ottoman-Armenian family
Edgar Manas (1875–1964), Turkish-Armenian composer, conductor and musicologist

Indian given name
Manas Kumar Mandal, is a scientist and psychologist of Delhi, India
Manas Mukherjee, Bengali music director
Manas Das, Indian footballer

Other uses
3349 Manas, a main-belt asteroid
Manas University, Kyrgyzstan
Manas International Public School, Jehanabad, Bihar, India
Manas Air, a defunct airline in Kyrgyzstan
MAN Türkiye A.Ş., stylized MANAŞ, MAN AG's truck and bus factory in Turkey
MANAS Journal, a weekly philosophical journal published in 1948–1988
 Manas, a crablike Bionicle (Lego toy)

See also
Mana (disambiguation)
Manasa, a Hindu goddess